The Air Force Falcons women's basketball team is the women's basketball team that represents the United States Air Force Academy in Colorado Springs, Colorado. The team currently competes in the Mountain West Conference. The Falcons are currently coached by Chris Gobrecht.

The Falcons competed at the Division II level in both the AIAW and NCAA from 1976 to 1996 before joining Division I. They played in the NCAA Division II tournament twice, in 1985 and 1990. Since then, they haven't made any tournament appearances.

Postseason

NCAA Division II tournament results
The Falcons made two appearances in the NCAA Division II women's basketball tournament. They had a combined record of 0–2.

AIAW College Division/Division II
The Falcons made two appearances in the AIAW National Division II basketball tournament, with a combined record of 0–2.

References

External links
 Official website

 
1976 establishments in Colorado